Khulna-2 is a constituency represented in the Jatiya Sangsad (National Parliament) of Bangladesh since 2019 by Sheikh Salahuddin Jewel of the Awami League.

Boundaries 
The constituency encompasses Khulna Sadar and Sonadanga thanas.

History 
The constituency was created for the first general elections in newly independent Bangladesh, held in 1973.

Ahead of the 2008 general election, the Election Commission redrew constituency boundaries to reflect population changes revealed by the 2001 Bangladesh census. The 2008 redistricting altered the boundaries of the constituency.

In the 2018 general election, the constituency was one of six chosen by lottery to use electronic voting machines.

Members of Parliament

Elections

Elections in the 2010s

Elections in the 2000s 

Khaleda Zia stood for five seats in the October 2001 general election: Bogra-6, Bogra-7, Khulna-2, Feni-1, and Lakshmipur-2. After winning all five, she chose to represent Bogra-6 and quit the other four, triggering by-elections in them. Ali Asgar Lobi of the BNP was elected unopposed after the Awami League decided not to contest the by-election scheduled for November.

Elections in the 1990s

References

External links
 

Parliamentary constituencies in Bangladesh
Khulna District